Molly Shaffer Van Houweling (born March 1, 1973) is an American cyclist, academic and legal scholar. Van Houweling is Professor of Law and Associate Dean at the UC Berkeley School of Law and serves as the chair of the board of Creative Commons. Van Houweling is also on the board of Authors Alliance a non-profit organization that helps authors disseminate their work broadly. She received her J.D. from the Harvard Law School in 1998. After law school she clerked for Judge Michael Boudin of the U.S. Court of Appeals for the First Circuit, and then in 2000-2001 for Justice David Souter of the U.S. Supreme Court. She was previously on the faculty of the University of Michigan Law School before moving to UC Berkeley.

In addition to her work as a legal academic and copyright activist, Shaffer Van Houweling is also a competitive bicycle racer. On September 12, 2015, she set a new Hour record by cycling 46.273 km in an hour. Van Houweling is also a six-time UCI Amateur Road World Champion, most recently winning the time trial titles at the 2018 UCI World Cycling Tour Final in Varese, Italy.

Palmares

2007
1st Northern California/Nevada Time Trial Championship

2009
1st Northern California/Nevada Time Trial Championship
1st Colorado Time Trial Championship

2010
1st Overall Mt. Hood Cycling Classic
1st Stage 2
1st Overall Kern County Women's Stage Race
1st Overall Topsport Stage
1st Copperopolis Road Race
1st Northern California/Nevada Time Trial Championship
1st Stage 1 Valley of the Sun Stage Race

2011
1st  UCI Masters World Championship Time Trial (W35-39)
1st Overall Valley of the Sun Stage Race
1st Stage 1
1st Northern California/Nevada Road Race Championship
1st Northern California/Nevada Time Trial Championship

2012
UCI Masters World Championship (W35-39)
1st  Time Trial 
1st  Road Race
1st Overall Mariposa Women's Stage Race
1st Northern California/Nevada Time Trial Championship
1st Northern California/Nevada Prestige Series

2014

UCI Masters World Championship (W40-44)
1st  Time Trial 
1st  Road Race
1st Northern California/Nevada Time Trial Championship
US Hour Record 44.173km

2015
UCI Hour Best Performance (W40-44) 46.088km
UCI Hour Record 46.273km
UCI Masters World Championship (W40-44)
1st  Time Trial 
1st  Road Race
1st Northern California/Nevada Time Trial Championship

2016
Masters National Track Championships
1st  Individual Pursuit (W40-44) 
National Records
40km Time Trial Record (W40-44), 52:48
Individual Pursuit (W40-44), 2:30.613
Kilo (W40-44), 1:16.104

2017
UCI Masters World Track Championships
1st  Team Pursuit (W40-44)
1st  Individual Pursuit (W40-44)
National Track Championships
1st  Team Pursuit
2nd Individual Pursuit
World Bests
UCI Hour Best Performance (W40-44), 47.061km
UCI Best Performance 2km Pursuit (W40-44), 2:24.753
National Records
Kilo (W40-44), 1:14.772
Team Pursuit (W40-44), 3:48.259

2018
UCI Masters World Road Championship (W45-49)
1st  Time Trial 
National Track Championships
1st  Team Pursuit
2nd Individual Pursuit
World Bests
UCI Hour Best Performance (W45-49), 46.897km
National Records
40km Time Trial Record (W45-49), 55:16.626

2019
National Track Championships
1st  Individual Pursuit

UCI Hour record attempts

UCI Masters Hour Best Performance attempts

Footnotes

See also 
 List of law clerks of the Supreme Court of the United States (Seat 3)

References

External links

 
 
 

 
 
 
 

1973 births
Living people
American female cyclists
American legal scholars
Harvard Law School alumni
Law clerks of the Supreme Court of the United States
Berkman Fellows
American women legal scholars
University of Michigan Law School faculty
American women academics
21st-century American women